In the last French Championships edition before Open Era that started in 1968, first-seeded Roy Emerson defeated Tony Roche 6–1, 6–4, 2–6, 6–2 in the final to win the men's singles tennis title at the 1967 French Championships.

Emerson became the first man in history to win a Double Career Grand Slam. This would be equalled by Rod Laver at the 1969 US Open, by Novak Djokovic at the 2021 French Open, and by Rafael Nadal at the 2022 Australian Open.

Seeds
The seeded players are listed below. Roy Emerson is the champion; others show the round in which they were eliminated.

  Roy Emerson (champion)
  Tony Roche (final)
  John Newcombe (fourth round)
  Nicola Pietrangeli (third round)
  István Gulyás (semifinals)
  Martin Mulligan (fourth round)
  Alexander Metreveli (third round)
  Pierre Darmon (quarterfinals)
  Bob Hewitt (fourth round)
  Cliff Drysdale (quarterfinals)
  Tom Okker (quarterfinals)
  Bill Bowrey (second round)
  Owen Davidson (quarterfinals)
  Nikola Pilić (semifinals)
  Jan Kodeš (fourth round)
  Jaidip Mukerjea (first round)

Draw

Key
 Q = Qualifier
 WC = Wild card
 LL = Lucky loser
 r = Retired

Finals

Earlier rounds

Section 1

Section 2

Section 3

Section 4

Section 5

Section 6

Section 7

Section 8

External links
   on the French Open website

1967
1967 in French tennis